The  is a railway line in Japan which connects the cities of Saitama, Kawaguchi, Tokyo, Kawasaki, and Yokohama. It is part of the East Japan Railway Company (JR East) network. The line's name is derived from the characters for Tokyo, Yokohama and the Tōhoku Main Line. The line runs parallel with the Tōkaidō Main Line between Yokohama and Tokyo and the Utsunomiya Line (part of the Tōhoku Main Line) except between Ueno and Akabane stations where the two lines are physically separate and thus alternate routes.

Most Keihin–Tōhoku Line trains have a through service onto the Negishi Line between Yokohama and Ōfuna stations. As a result, the entire service between Ōmiya and Ōfuna is typically referred to as the Keihin-Tōhoku–Negishi Line on system maps and in-train station guides. Keihin-Tōhoku Line–Negishi Line trains are recognizable by their light blue stripe (the line's color on maps is also light blue).

Service outline
Trains run every 2–3 minutes at peak hours, every 5 minutes during the daytime, and less frequently the rest of the time. These rapid trains skip some stations in central Tokyo, where the Keihin-Tōhoku Line runs parallel to the Yamanote Line.

Station list
 Local trains stop at all stations. Rapid trains stop at stations marked "●" and "■" on weekdays. (Stations marked "■" allow cross-platform transfers to the Yamanote Line). Additionally, stations marked "▲" are served by rapid trains on weekends and national holidays only.

Keihin–Tōhoku Line

Rolling stock

As of January 2010, all Keihin-Tohoku Line services are formed of E233-1000 series 10-car electrical multiple unit (EMU) trains. These were phased in from December 2007, and replaced the previous 209 series 10-car EMUs by 24 January 2010. All Keihin-Tohoku Line rolling stock is based at Urawa Depot. Yokohama Line E233-6000 series 8-car EMUs also operate on through services over the Keihin-Tohoku Line between Higashi-Kanagawa and Ofuna stations.

Keihin–Tohoku Line & Negishi Line services
 E233-1000 series 10-car EMUs (sky blue stripe) (from December 2007)

Yokohama Line through services
 E233-6000 series 8-car EMUs (light/dark green stripe) (from February 2014)

Rolling stock used in the past
72 series 8-car EMUs (brown livery) (until October 1970)
101 series 10-car EMUs (sky blue livery) (from December 1970 until March 1978)
103 series 10-car EMUs (sky blue livery) (from October 1965 until March 1998)
205 series 10-car EMU  (sky blue stripe) (from October 1989 until February 1996)
 205 series 8-car EMUs (light/dark green stripe, on Yokohama Line through services until August 2014)
209-900 series 10-car EMUs (sky blue stripe) (from May 1992 until August 2007)
209-0 series 10-car EMUs (sky blue stripe) (from March 1993 until January 2010)
209-500 series 10-car EMUs (sky blue stripe) (from January 2001 until 2009)

Timeline

History

The line opened on 20 December 1914 as an electrified passenger line connecting Shinagawa Station in Tokyo with Takashimacho Station in Yokohama. (The latter station was renamed Yokohama Station in August 1915, when the former Yokohama Station was renamed Sakuragicho Station). It was originally called the Tokaido Electric Line() and was subsequently renamed to the Keihin Line(). From 30 December 1915, services were extended south to the new Sakuragicho Station.

The Keihin Line service was extended north via the Tohoku Main Line to Akabane Station in February 1928, and to Ōmiya Station in September 1932.

The Keihin Line initially had third-class and second-class cars, analogous to today's ordinary cars and Green Cars respectively. Second-class service ended in 1938 in order to accommodate special military cars during the World War II. The military seating was converted to seating for women and children after the war, and back to ordinary seating in 1973 amid overcrowding concerns: second-class service was briefly restored in the 1950s but abandoned shortly thereafter.

From November 1956, the Keihin-Tohoku Line was physically separated from the Yamanote Line between Tamachi and Tabata, allowing more frequent service. Through service with the Negishi Line began on 19 May 1964. 10-car trains (103 series) began operating from 1 April 1966.

Limited-stop "Rapid" services were introduced in 1988 to further ease congestion along the Yamanote Line corridor. From 14 March 2015, all rapid services began serving Kanda Station. Additionally, rapid services began serving Okachimachi Station on weekends and national holidays only.

On 20 August 2016, station numbering was introduced with stations being assigned station numbers between JK12 and JK47. Numbers increase towards in the northbound direction towards Omiya.

A new station, the Takanawa Gateway Station, opened on 14 March 2020, in time for the 2020 Summer Olympics to be held in Tokyo. The distance between Shinagawa and Tamachi stations was 2.2 km. Takanawa Gateway was constructed on top of the 20-hectare former railyard, which is undergoing rationalization and redevelopment by JR East. The Yamanote Line and the Keihin Tohoku Line tracks were moved slightly to the east to be aligned closer to the Tokaido Shinkansen tracks. The area on the west side of the yard made available will be redeveloped with high-rise office buildings, creating an international business center with good connections to the Shinkansen and Haneda Airport.

Accidents
At around 01:11 in the morning of 23 February 2014, an empty stock train operating from Sakuragicho to Kamata hit a track maintenance vehicle on the track close to Kawasaki Station. The first two cars of the 10-car E233 series train derailed, with the first car ending up on its side. The train was carrying no passengers, and the driver and conductor escaped with minor injuries.

See also

 List of railway lines in Japan

References

External links

 Stations of the Keihin-Tōhoku Line (JR East) 
 japan-guide.com: JR Keihin-Tōhoku Line

Lines of East Japan Railway Company
Railway lines in Tokyo
Rail transport in Saitama Prefecture
Railway lines in Kanagawa Prefecture
1067 mm gauge railways in Japan
Railway lines opened in 1914
1914 establishments in Japan